William Richard Howley (July 6, 1875 – April 18, 1941) was a lawyer and politician in Newfoundland. He represented St. George's from 1900 to 1904 and Placentia and St. Mary's from 1909 to 1913 in the Newfoundland House of Assembly.

The son of James Patrick Howley and Elizabeth Jane Firth, he was born in St. John's and was educated at St. Bonaventure's College there. He studied law with Robert Kent and was called to the Newfoundland bar in 1898. He became the senior partner in Howley and Herder in 1909. Howley was named King's Counsel in 1911.

Elected as a Liberal in 1900, he joined the Conservatives after a dispute with Robert Bond. He was defeated when he ran for reelection as a Conservative in 1904. Howley ran unsuccessfully as a People's Party candidate in 1908 but was elected in 1909. He ran unsuccessfully for reelection in St. John's East in 1913. In 1928, he was named Minister of Justice in the Newfoundland cabinet but failed in his bid for election later that year. When responsible government was suspended in 1934, Howley served as Commissioner of Justice and Attorney General in the Commission of Government. From 1936 to 1938, he served as vice-chair of the Commission. He was later named registrar for the Supreme Court.

Howley married Mary Ryan in 1905 and the couple had two daughters. He died in St. John's at the age of 65.

References 

Members of the Newfoundland and Labrador House of Assembly
Members of the Executive Council of Newfoundland and Labrador
1875 births
1941 deaths
Members of the Newfoundland Commission of Government
Newfoundland People's Party MHAs
Newfoundland Colony people
Government ministers of the Dominion of Newfoundland
Attorneys-General of the Dominion of Newfoundland